Estate Saint George Historic District is a historic district in the Northwest subdistrict near Fredericksted in Saint Croix, U.S. Virgin Islands which was listed on the National Register of Historic Places in 1986.  The listing included eight contributing buildings, nine contributing sites, and seven contributing structures.

The property was then owned and operated by the St. George Village Botanical Garden of St. Croix, Inc.

References

Sugar plantations in Saint Croix, U.S. Virgin Islands
Plantations in the Danish West Indies
Buildings and structures completed in 1816
Historic districts on the National Register of Historic Places in the United States Virgin Islands
Buildings and structures on the National Register of Historic Places in the United States Virgin Islands
1816 establishments in North America
1810s establishments in the Caribbean
1816 establishments in Denmark
19th century in the Danish West Indies